Rafael Guerrero Ramírez (born 13 January 2003) is a Mexican professional footballer who plays as a centre-back for Liga MX club Cruz Azul.

Career statistics

Club

Honours
Cruz Azul
Supercopa de la Liga MX: 2022

References

External links

 
 

Living people
2003 births
Mexican footballers
Association football defenders
Cruz Azul footballers
Liga MX players
Footballers from Baja California
Sportspeople from Tijuana